TDRS-4, known before launch as TDRS-D, is an American communications satellite, of first generation, which was operated by NASA as part of the Tracking and Data Relay Satellite System from 1989 until 2011. It was constructed by TRW, based on a custom satellite bus which was used for all seven of the first generation TDRS satellites.

History

TDRS-D was launched aboard  during the STS-29 mission in 1989. Discovery launched from Launch Complex 39B at the Kennedy Space Center at 14:57:00 UTC on 13 March 1989. TDRS-D was deployed from Discovery a few hours after launch, and was raised to geostationary orbit by means of an Inertial Upper Stage.

Deployment
The twin-stage solid-propellant Inertial Upper Stage made two burns. The first stage burn occurred shortly after deployment from Discovery, and placed the satellite into a geostationary transfer orbit (GTO). At 03:30 UTC on 14 March 1989, it reached apogee, and the second stage fired, placing TDRS-D into geostationary orbit. At this point, it received its operational designation, TDRS-4. It was placed at a longitude 41.0° West of the Greenwich Meridian, from where it provided communications services to spacecraft in Earth orbit, including the Space Shuttle and International Space Station. In 2005, it was relocated to 46.0° West.

Retirement
In May 2012, NASA reported that the orbit-raising manoeuvre had been completed successfully, and the spacecraft had been retired.

See also 

 List of TDRS satellites

References 

Derelict satellites orbiting Earth
Spacecraft launched in 1989
TDRS satellites
Spacecraft launched by the Space Shuttle